The University Clinical Centre of Niš (abbr. УКЦН / UKCN) is an academic medical centre located in Niš, Serbia. It serves as the main medical centre for both Niš and Southern and Southeastern Serbia.

History

The Clinical Centre of Niš was established on 14 November 1990. It is the second largest hospital in Serbia after Clinical Centre of Serbia (based in Belgrade) and serves more than 2 million people mostly from Southern and Southeastern Serbia.

In December 2017, new main building of the Clinical Centre spreading over 45,000 square meters with surrounding clinics and building was officially opened. The estimated cost of the investment, including the purchase of new medical equipment, stands at 50 million euros.

In January 2018, the Emergency Center moved in new building of the Clinical Centre. In April 2019, a helipad was opened.

In January 2021. Government of Serbia decided that Clinical Centre of Niš will be renamed to University Clinical Centre of Niš, and that it will serve as academic medical centre.

In April 2021, the Emergency Center took the name of its late director, dr Miodrag Lazić who died in red zone of Covid Hospital, during most difficult time of Covid-19 Epidemy in Niš.

Organization
The Clinical Centre of Niš contains 28 organisational units, of which 22 are clinics, 3 institution centers other service units. The complex also houses the University of Niš Faculty Of Medicine. As of 2017, the Clinical Centre has a capacity of 1,525 beds and has more than 3,000 employees, of which 745 are doctors and more than 1,500 other medical workers.

Annually, more than half million patients are treated, 55,000 hospitalized and over 75,000 surgeries performed.

See also
 Healthcare in Serbia
 List of hospitals in Serbia

References

External links
 Official website

Hospitals in Serbia
Hospitals established in 1990
1990 establishments in Serbia
Buildings and structures in Niš
Hospital buildings completed in 2017